Alexeyevka, Alekseyevka, Alekseevka, or Alexeevka, may refer to:
Alexeyevka, Belgorod Oblast, a town in Russia
Alekseyevka, Chüy, a village in Chüy Region, Kyrgyzstan
Alexeyevka, Kazakhstan, a town in Kazakhstan
Alekseyevka, Khachmaz, a village in Khachmaz District, Azerbaijan
Alekseyevka, Quba, a village in Quba District, Azerbaijan
Alexeyevka, Russia, several inhabited localities in Russia
Həsənsu, or Alekseyevka, Agstafa District, Azerbaijan
Kamenny Ruchey air base, or Alekseyevka, in the Russian Far East
Ketmen-Töbö, a town in Jalal-Abad Region, Kyrgyzstan, formerly Alekseyevka
Torez, city in Ukraine, currently Chystiakove, formerly Oleksiivka (Alekseevka)
Alexeyevka, Moldova, a village in Gagauzia, Moldova

See also
Alexey
Alexeyev
Alexeyevsky (disambiguation)